Darren Treacy may refer to:

 Darren Treacy (rugby league) (born 1971), Australian former rugby league footballer
 Darren Treacy (footballer) (born 1970), English former footballer